D&C Red 33 also known as Acid Red 33 or simply Red 33 is a red azo dye used as a colorant in mouthwashes, dentifrices, cosmetics, and hair dyes. Red 33 is a disodium salt of 5-amino-4-hydroxy-3-(phenylazo)-2,7-naphthalenedisulfonic acid, which can be purified through high performance liquid chromatography.

References

Azo dyes
Organic sodium salts